Henrietta is a census-designated place and unincorporated community in Rutherford County, North Carolina, United States.

Demographics

References

Census-designated places in Rutherford County, North Carolina
Unincorporated communities in North Carolina
Census-designated places in North Carolina